Alexandre Angélique de Talleyrand-Périgord (16 October 1736, Paris – 20 October 1821, Paris) was a French churchman and politician. He was the paternal uncle of Charles-Maurice de Talleyrand-Périgord (1754–1838).

Life

Education
Alexandre Angélique de Talleyrand-Périgord attended the Jesuit school of La Flèche en Sarthe. He continued at the Saint-Sulpice seminary in Paris, where he graduated with a degree in theology, and at the law faculty at Reims where he obtained a license in utroque jure that is to say, jointly in both canon law and civil law.

Early ecclesiastical career
Talleyrand-Périgord was ordained a priest in 1761. He returned to the service of the vicar general of the diocese of Verdun in 1762. He was elected bishop in partibus of Trajanopolis and was appointed Bishop coadjutor of Reims on December 27, 1766. He was also Grand Almoner of France. He was elevated to the Archbishopric of Reims on October 27, 1777 and became Abbot commendatory of the abbey Notre-Dame de Cercamp from 1777 to 1789. 

Talleyrand-Périgord was a member of the Assembly of the Clergy from 1780 to 1788, member of the Assembly of Notables in 1787 and deputy of the clergy to the Estates General of 1789.

Exile

After the Civil Constitution of the Clergy, he emigrated in 1790 and stayed successively in Aix-la-Chapelle, Weimar and Brunswick.  During this time, he had the Abbé Nicolas Baronnet (1744–1820), vicar of Cernay-en-Dormois (Marne), as his secretary. In 1801, he refused to submit to the Concordat between the Pope and Napoleon Bonaparte and did not resign his position as Archbishop of Reims.

In 1803 he became the representative of the Bourbon heir, Louis XVIII, who was exiled in Poland. Together they came to England, living at Gosfield Hall in Essex and Hartwell House, Buckinghamshire. In 1808, Louis appointed him Grand Almoner, a position he would continue to occupy after the Restoration and until his death.

Restoration

In 1814 he returned to France upon the first Restoration, and in 1815 he followed Louis XVIII back into exile during the Hundred Days. After the second Restoration, he became a Peer of France. He finally resigned the Archbishopric of Reims on November 8, 1816. 

He was one of the main architects of the Concordat of 11 June 1817. Pope Pius VII created him cardinal during the consistory of July 28, 1817. Talleyrand-Périgord was then named Archbishop of Paris on October 1, 1817, but was not installed until 1819.

Distinctions
Commander of the Order of the Holy Spirit

1736 births
1821 deaths
Alexandre
Archbishops of Reims
Archbishops of Paris
19th-century French cardinals
18th-century peers of France
Members of the Chamber of Peers of the Bourbon Restoration
Cardinals created by Pope Pius VII